Hans Iklé (31 March 1906 – 22 February 1996) was a Swiss equestrian. He competed in two events at the 1936 Summer Olympics.

References

External links
 

1906 births
1996 deaths
Swiss male equestrians
Olympic equestrians of Switzerland
Equestrians at the 1936 Summer Olympics
Sportspeople from St. Gallen (city)
20th-century Swiss people